John Christopher Dancy (13 November 1920 – 28 December 2019) was an English headmaster, at Lancing College , where he was appointed to improve academic standards, and Marlborough College, and academic. He was best known for his reforms at Marlborough, including the introduction of a coeducational Sixth Form.

Life
The son of Dr. John Dancy of Richmond, Surrey, he was educated at Winchester College, and studied at New College, Oxford.

Dancy served in the British Army during World War II, first as a 2nd lieutenant in the Rifle Brigade in 1940. He was in its 8th Battalion to 1944, when he became an intelligence officer in the Second Army. He was a General Staff Officer in 30 Corps 1944–5, and in the I Airborne Corps in 1945.

Educator
After the war, Dancy lectured in classics at Wadham College, Oxford, from 1946 to 1948. He taught as an assistant master at Winchester College from 1948 to 1953, and became headmaster of Lancing College in 1953. where academic standards had fallen.   He went on to become Master of Marlborough College, in 1961.

In 1965 Dancy introduced business studies into the Marlborough curriculum, a high profile reaction to the Robbins Report. In 1968 came the introduction of girls to the Sixth Form, Marlborough being the first of the Headmasters' Conference institutions for boys (including most of the traditional British public schools) to take this step.

Later life
After leaving his post at Marlborough, Dancy was Principal of St Luke's College, Exeter, from 1972 to 1978. St Luke's became part of the University of Exeter, and Dancy was Professor of Education there.<ref>Back Matter, Oxford Review of Education
Vol. 8, No. 1 (1982). Published by: Taylor & Francis, Ltd. </ref>

Dancy died aged 99. He walked with a limp, caused by polio.

Works
 Commentary on I Maccabees (1954)
 The Public Schools and the Future (1963)
 Commentary on the Shorter Books of the Apocrypha (1972)
 Walter Oakeshott: a diversity of gifts (1995)
 The Divine Drama: The Old Testament as Literature'' (2001)

Family
In 1944 Dancy married Angela Bryant, daughter of C. L. Bryant of Harrow. They had two sons and a daughter. Jonathan Dancy is one of the sons.

References

1920 births
2019 deaths
Alumni of New College, Oxford
British Army personnel of World War II
Schoolteachers from Surrey
Head Masters of Lancing College
Masters of Marlborough College
People educated at Winchester College
Rifle Brigade officers